Thomas Addison was an American Negro league shortstop in the 1910s.

Addison played for the Philadelphia Giants in 1910 and 1911. In 20 recorded games, he posted 11 hits in 72 plate appearances.

References

External links
Baseball statistics and player information from Baseball-Reference Black Baseball Stats and Seamheads

Year of birth missing
Year of death missing
Place of birth missing
Place of death missing
Philadelphia Giants players
Baseball shortstops